Gregg Adam Rakoczy (born May 18, 1965) is a former American football player who was a center for the Cleveland Browns from 1987 to 1990 and  the New England Patriots from 1991 to 1992. Rakoczy was drafted 32nd overall in the second round of the 1987 NFL Draft. He went to college at the University of Miami, Florida.  He is originally from Medford Lakes, New Jersey and attended Shawnee High School in Medford Township, New Jersey.Married to Dana Maud-Rakoczy his college girlfriend, has 4 children.

References

External links
Catching up with Gregg Rakoczy

1965 births
Living people
Players of American football from New Jersey
People from Medford Lakes, New Jersey
Shawnee High School (New Jersey) alumni
Sportspeople from Burlington County, New Jersey
American football centers
Miami Hurricanes football players
Cleveland Browns players
New England Patriots players